The  was a large and powerful carrier-borne torpedo-dive bomber produced by Aichi Kokuki for the Imperial Japanese Navy Air Service during the Second World War. Built in only small numbers and deprived of the aircraft carriers it was intended to operate from, the type had little chance to distinguish itself in combat before the war ended in August 1945.

Design and development
The B7A Ryusei (originally designated AM-23 by Aichi) was designed in response to a 1941 16-Shi requirement issued by the Imperial Japanese Navy Air Service for a carrier attack bomber that would replace both the Nakajima B6N Tenzan torpedo plane and the Yokosuka D4Y Suisei dive bomber in IJN service. It was intended for use aboard a new generation of Taihō-class carriers, the first of which was laid down in July 1941.

Chief Engineer Toshio Ozaki (name often seen as Norio Ozaki, but this is incorrect because the Kanji for both first names are the same and often confused) chose a mid-wing arrangement for the B7A to provide for an internal bomb-bay and to ensure enough clearance for the plane's  four-bladed propeller. This in turn necessitated the adoption of an inverted gull wing, reminiscent of the F4U Corsair, in order to shorten the length of the main landing gear. The wing featured extendable ailerons with a ten-degree range of deflection, enabling them to act as auxiliary flaps. Dive brakes were fitted underneath just outboard of the fuselage.

Selection of a powerplant was dictated by the Japanese Navy which requested that Aichi design the aircraft around the 1,360 kW (1,825 hp) Nakajima NK9C Homare 12 18-cylinder two-row air-cooled radial engine. This was expected to become the Navy's standard aircraft engine in the 1,340 kW (1,800 hp) to 1,641 kW (2,200 hp) range. One production model B7A2 was later fitted with a 1,491 kW (2,000 hp) Nakajima Homare 23 radial engine and plans were also made to fit the 1,641 kW (2,200 hp) Mitsubishi MK9 radial to an advanced version of the Ryusei (designated B7A3 Ryusei Kai) but the latter effort never came to fruition.

The B7A had a weight-carrying capacity stemming from its requirements, resulting in a weapons load no greater than its predecessors. The presence of an internal bomb bay with two high-load-capability attachment points allowed the aircraft to carry two 250 kg (550 lb) or six 60 kg (132 lb) bombs. Alternatively, it could carry a single externally mounted Type 91 torpedo, weighing up to 848 kg (1,870 lb).

Defensive armament initially consisted of two 20mm Type 99 Model 2 cannons in the wing roots and one flexible 7.92mm Type 1 machine-gun mounted in the rear cockpit. Later production models of the B7A2 featured a 13mm Type 2 machine-gun in place of the 7.92mm gun.

Despite the plane's weight and size, it displayed fighter-like handling and performance, beating the version of the A6M Zero in service at the time. It was fast and highly maneuverable.

Given the codename "Grace" by the Allies, the B7A first flew as a prototype in May 1942, but teething problems with the experimental NK9C Homare engine and necessary modifications to the airframe meant that the type did not enter into production until two years later in May 1944. Nine prototype B7A1s were built and 80 production version B7A2s completed by Aichi before a severe earthquake in May 1945 destroyed the factory at Funakata where they were being assembled. A further 25 examples were produced at the 21st Naval Air Arsenal at Omura.

Operational history
In June 1944, the Taihō was the only Imperial Japanese Navy aircraft carrier then modern enough to operate the B7A Ryusei in its intended role. Other Japanese carriers lacked the modern arresting gear necessary to assist the recovery of aircraft weighing over 4000 kg. However, Taiho was sunk during the Battle of the Philippine Sea before enough B7As were even available to embark. Afterward, the B7A was relegated to operating from land bases, primarily with the Yokosuka and 752nd Air Groups. The Japanese completed only one other carrier capable of operating the B7A, the Shinano, which was sunk by an American submarine in November 1944, just ten days after being commissioned.

Variants
B7A1 One prototype and eight supplementary prototypes.
B7A2 Two-seat torpedo-dive bomber aircraft for the Imperial Japanese Navy; 105 built.
B7A2 Experimental One aircraft fitted with a 1,491 kW (2,000 hp) Nakajima Homare 23 radial engine.
B7A3 Proposed version with a 1641 kW (2,200 hp) Mitsubishi MK9A (Ha-43). Not built.

Number built
According to Model Art (2000), p. 72.
Funakata Factory, Aichi Kokuki, Nagoya, work number 3201-3289.

21st Naval Air Arsenal, Imperial Japanese Navy, Ōmura, work number 1-25.

Operators

Imperial Japanese Navy Air Service
Yokosuka Naval Air Group
131st Naval Air Group
752nd Naval Air Group
1001st Naval Air Group
5th Attack Squadron, a part of 131st/752nd Naval Air Group

Specifications (B7A2)

See also

Notes

Bibliography
 Chant, Chris. Aircraft of World War II - 300 of the World's Greatest aircraft 1939-45. Amber Books Ltd., 1999. .
 Francillon, Ph.D., René J. Japanese Aircraft of the Pacific War. London: Putnam & Company Ltd., 1979. .
 Gunston, Bill. Military Aviation Library World War II: Japanese & Italian Aircraft. Salamander Books Ltd., 1985. .

 Mondey, David. Concise Guide to Axis Aircraft of World War II. Temple Press, 1984. .
 Model Art Special Issue Carrier Attack Bombers of the Imperial Japanese Navy. Model Art Co., Ltd., 2000.

External links

 
  Aichi B7A2 Ryusei (Shooting Star) GRACE  - National Air and Space Museum
 IJN Pics

B7A
B7A, Aichi
B7A, Aichi
B7A, Aichi
Single-engined tractor aircraft
Low-wing aircraft
Inverted gull-wing aircraft
Carrier-based aircraft
Aircraft first flown in 1942